The 17th Ibero-American Championships in Athletics were held at the Estádio Olímpico João Havelange in Rio de Janeiro, Brazil, between May 14-16, 2016. Since the event served also as the athletics event test for the 2016 Summer Olympics, countries that do not compete at Ibero-American Championships attended the event, including United States, Saudi Arabia and Australia. However, medals won by those athletes did not count toward the total medal tally.

A total of 44 events were contested, 22 by men and 22 by women.

Medal summary

Men

Women

Medal table

Participating nations
According to an unofficial count, 355 athletes from 28 countries participated, including five guest nations (*). Missing Ibero-American countries were Andorra, Equatorial Guinea, Mozambique, Nicaragua, and São Tomé and Príncipe.

References

Full results

External links
Official site

Ibero-American Championships in Athletics
International sports competitions in Rio de Janeiro (city)
International athletics competitions hosted by Brazil
Ibero-American Championships
Ibero-American Championships
Athletics in Rio de Janeiro (city)
Athletics
May 2016 sports events in South America